Dmytro Davydovych Kysylevskyi (born 23 April 1983) is a Ukrainian politician currently serving as a People's Deputy of Ukraine from Ukraine's 24th electoral district as a member of Servant of the People since 2019. He is Deputy Chairman of the Verkhovna Rada Committee on Economic Development.

Early life and career 
He was born on 23 April 1983, in Kyiv. In 1999, he graduated from gymnasium No. 178 and entered the Igor Sikorsky Kyiv Polytechnic Institute, graduating with a specialty in administrative management.

In 2012, he participated in the opening of the electric arc furnace complex of Interpipe Steel. He is a member of the Supervisory Board of Interpipe Novomoskovsk Pipe Plant in Novomoskovsk, Dnipro region, until 2019.

He is the organizer of the largest engineering show in Ukraine, Interpipe TechFest, initiator of a network of mechatronics laboratories in the Dnieper, co-organizer of the Interpipe Dnipro Half Marathon. He headed the volunteer headquarters of the company to help employees mobilized to the Armed Forces of Ukraine.

Political career 
Deputy Chairman of the Verkhovna Rada Committee on Economic Development. He specialises in industrial policy, rgw space industry, exports and foreign trade. As of December 2020, the deputy became the author of 36 draft laws and resolutions, and 180 amendments to bills.

2020-2021 
He was one of the deputies who demanded the allocation of ₴148.5 million for the utilization and storage of rocket fuel for the PA Pivdenmash plant and the Pavlohrad Chemical Plant, as well as the allocation of ₴550 million in the 2021 budget for solid fuel utilization.

He also was among the authors of a demand that Prime Minister Denys Shmyhal disclose the risks to the Ukrainian economy from signing a free trade agreement with Turkey.

He is the author of the law on localization, which required the use of at least 10% of the Ukrainian component in the procurement of public transport, municipal equipment, railway transport, energy engineering products, and aerospace since 2022. This threshold is to be increased by 5% annually, up to 40%, and will remain in effect until 2032.

References

1983 births
Living people
Ninth convocation members of the Verkhovna Rada
Kyiv Polytechnic Institute alumni
Politicians from Kyiv
Servant of the People (political party) politicians